The Southern Association for Women Historians (SAWH) is a professional organization in the United States founded in 1970. It supports the study of women’s and gender history of the American South, gives annual book and article prizes, and provides networking opportunities for its members, especially at its triennial conference.

Mission
The Southern Association for Women Historians (SAWH) is an American nonprofit professional association formed in 1970 in Louisville, Kentuckyto support women historians living in the South and provide a forum for the study of southern women’s history. Most of the organization’s members study the American South but historians in any field who live in the southern states are encouraged to join. The SAWH welcomes public historians, independent scholars, and graduate students in addition to academic historians. The organization is known for its support and mentoring of graduate students. The SAWH “values individuals and their differences including race, economic status, gender expression and identity, sex, sexual orientation, ethnicity, national origin, first language, religion, age, and ability status." The SAWH is governed by an Executive Council and its work is accomplished by committees made up of volunteers from among the membership.

History 
In December 1969, a group of women historians associated with the American Historical Association formed an independent association, the Coordinating Committee on Women in the Historical Profession.  At a November 1970 meeting of the Southern Historical Association, several women who had attended that previous meeting formed the Southern Association of Women Historians in Louisville, Kentucky. In 1983, it was renamed to the Southern Association for Women Historians (SAWH).  

The organization's first conference was in June 1988 in Spartanburg, South Carolina.  The conference has been held every three years since then, except in 2021, when the conference was delayed to 2022 due to precautions against COVID-19. 

The talks at these conferences have been well received.  Several volumes of original scholarship have resulted from the conference papers, including:
 Searching for Their Places: Women in the South Across Four Centuries (2003)
 Negotiating Boundaries of Southern Womanhood: Dealing with the Powers that Be (2000)

Prizes and Fellowships 
In 1989, the organization established the A. Elizabeth Taylor Prize for the best scholarly article on Southern women's history, and in 1992 established the Jacquelyn Dowd Hall Prize for the best graduate student paper submitted to the triennial conference. In addition to these prizes, the SAWH gives two book awards annually: the Julia Cherry Spruill Prize for the best published book in southern women's history, broadly construed, and the Willie Lee Rose Prize, for the best book on any topic in southern history written by a woman (or women). Every other year, the SAWH awards the Anne Firor Scott Mid-Career Fellowship to support scholars who are working on a second book or similar project in southern and/or gender history.

50th Anniversary 
Due to restrictions of the COVID-19 pandemic, the SAWH hosted a celebratory meeting and annual lecture online during the annual Southern Historical Association meeting. The SAWH Annual Address and Awards Ceremony took place on November 20, 2020, hosted by SAWH President Jennifer L. Ritterhouse. The recording of the event is viewable on the SAWH website. During the Web conference, the 50th Anniversary Mentorship Wall of Fame was unveiled. Names of the mentors can be viewed by clicking on the image of the Wall of Fame. 

In Baltimore in November 2022, the SAWH celebrated the organization’s 50th anniversary in person at the Southern Historical Association annual meeting. After the Annual Address by Amy Murrell Taylor, members enjoyed a reception at the Reginald F. Lewis Museum of Maryland African American History & Culture. The organization honored all fourteen past presidents who were in attendance. A special cake celebrated 2022 president Anne Rubin, 2021 president Diane Miller Sommerville, and 2020 president Jennifer Ritterhouse, as the latter two had not had the opportunity to have an in-person reception in their honor due to the pandemic.

Learning Opportunity 
The Southern Association for Women Historians has created resources, such as the online Mentoring Toolkit and the Mentoring in Action webinar series, to assist women historians and graduate students. These resources provide insights and information from prominent scholars in the field.

Presidents of the Southern Association for Women Historians since its founding in 1970

In popular culture
Murder, She Wrote: The Last Free Man (TV movie.	May 2, 2001) https://www.imdb.com/title/tt0284330/?ref_=tt_urv

References

Sources

External links 
 

History organizations based in the United States
Organizations established in 1970
1970 establishments in Kentucky
Organizations based in Louisville, Kentucky
Professional associations based in the United States
Professional associations for women
Women's organizations based in the United States
Women in Kentucky